FabricLive.22 is a DJ mix compilation album by Scratch Perverts, as part of the FabricLive Mix Series.

Track listing

External links
Fabric: FabricLive.22

2005 compilation albums